Vasile Blaga (born 26 July 1956) is a Romanian politician who was Speaker of the Upper Chamber of the Romanian Parliament, the Senate, from 2011 to 2012. He also served as Minister of Regional Development and Housing and twice as Minister of Administration and Internal Affairs.

A member of the Democratic Party (PD), he was the Minister of Administration and Interior in the first Călin Popescu-Tăriceanu government (December, 2004–March, 2007) as well as in one of the Emil Boc's governments. He resigned on 27 September 2010.

On 28 November 2011, Blaga was appointed President of the Senate of Romania after the revocation of Mircea Geoană on 23 November. On 30 June 2012, he became the leader of PDL in an extraordinary session following the huge loss suffered by the party in the local elections earlier that month. He was dismissed from the office of President of the Senate on 3 July 2012.

Political career

Born in Petrileni, Bihor County, Blaga started his political career after the fall of Communism in Romania in 1989. He was a Member of Parliament in the Romanian Chamber of Deputies, representing Bihor County, between 1990 and 1991, after which he became the Prefect of Bihor, serving until 1993.

Following the legislative election of 1996, he became a member of the Romanian Senate from the Democratic Party, representing Bihor County. He was reelected at the 2004 election for the Justice and Truth Alliance (DA), of which the Democratic Party (PD) was a member, representing Bucharest (where he presently resides). Blaga was appointed as the Minister of Administration and Interior Affairs later in the same year.

In 2008, he was a candidate for the position of mayor of Bucharest from the Democratic Liberal Party (PDL), seeking to replace incumbent mayor Adriean Videanu, who did not want to compete for a second term.

He came second in the first round of the elections, trailing independent Sorin Oprescu. For the second round, he gained the support of Gigi Becali's New Generation Party (PNG) and of the Social Democrat mayor Bucharest's Sector 2, Neculai Onțanu, as well as the opposition of National Liberal Party (PNL) and the Social Democratic Party (PSD). Oprescu won the race on a 56-44 margin. He was the president of the Democratic Liberal Party (PDL) until its dissolution in the summer of 2014, when it merged with the National Liberal Party (PNL), of which he served as co-president, along with Alina Gorghiu, until 28 September 2016. On that date, Blaga was charged with influence peddling by the National Anticorruption Directorate and announced his resignation as party co-leader, though he maintained he is innocent.

Electoral history

Mayor of Bucharest

References

External links
 Profile of Vasile Blaga on the Romanian Chamber of Deputies site

|-

|-

 
|-

 

1956 births
Living people
People from Bihor County
Politehnica University of Timișoara alumni
Romanian presidential advisors
Democratic Liberal Party (Romania) politicians
Romanian Ministers of Interior
Romanian Ministers of Regional Development
Presidents of the Senate of Romania
Members of the Chamber of Deputies (Romania)
Prefects of Romania
MEPs for Romania 2019–2024
Chairpersons of the National Liberal Party (Romania)